Delos Hight Brown (October 4, 1892 – December 21, 1964) was a Major League Baseball player for the Chicago White Sox. He was born in Anna, Illinois, and attended Millikin University. In 1914, he became captain of the Millikin baseball team and led them to a conference championship. He was then signed by the White Sox.

Brown appeared in one major league game, on June 12, 1914. He was a pinch hitter and struck out in his only at bat. Afterwards, he played the rest of the season for the Decatur Commodores of the Illinois–Indiana–Iowa League and batted .192 in 63 games. His organized baseball career ended the following season.

Brown died in Carbondale, Illinois, at the age of 72.

References

External links

1892 births
1964 deaths
Chicago White Sox players
Decatur Commodores players
Baseball players from Illinois
Millikin Big Blue baseball players